Carlos Jose "Caloy" Garcia is a Filipino professional basketball coach and former TV host. He is an assistant coach for the Rain or Shine Elasto Painters of the Philippine Basketball Association (PBA).

Early life
Caloy Garcia was born to a Spanish father who is from Malaga and a Filipino mother. He studied at De La Salle-College of Saint Benilde and briefly played for the Dazz Dishwashing Paste in the PBL. He is a cousin of San Miguel Beermen head coach Jorge Gallent, also a Benildean. He assisted Garcia in the De La Salle-College of Saint Benilde and the Welcoat Paintmasters prior to his winning run with the Harbour Centre Batang Pier.

He was one of the male hosts of Sunday noontime variety show, GMA Supershow.

Coaching career

Welcoat assistant(PBL)
He assisted Leo Austria in the Welcoat Paintmasters from 2002 to 2004.

Welcoat/Rain or Shine
He was the head coach of the Welcoat Paintmasters from 2005 up to its last year in 2006. He even led them to a PBL title (Unity Cup) in 2005 defeating the Monataña Pawnshop, 3-1.

CSB Blazers coach
He was hired in 2005 to replace Tonichi Ytturi as head coach of the Benilde Blazers. Under him, he produced NCAA MVP Jay Sagad. Later, he led them to 5-9, 3-11, and 1-11 records respectively. He was later replaced by Gee Abanilla.

Welcoat assistant
He again assisted Leo Austria in the Welcoat Paintmasters from 2006 to 2008. Austria then resigned after the Philippine Cup.

Welcoat/Rain or Shine
He was hired as an interim coach of the Dragons and eventually the team's head coach in 2008. After being eliminated by the San Miguel Beermen during the quarterfinals of the 2010–11 Philippine Cup, Rain or Shine announced that Garcia will be replaced by Yeng Guiao as head coach. Garcia will slide down as the head assistant coach of the team.

Letran Knights
Upon the resignation of Louie Alas, Garcia was chosen to become the head coach of the Colegio de San Juan de Letran Knights. He will start coaching Letran during the 2013–2014 NCAA season. He led the Knights into the finals, when they lost to San Beda Red Lions.

Personal life
He is a cousin of professional footballers and Philippine internationals Angel Guirado and Juan Luis Guirado. Garcia is also the uncle of actress Coleen Garcia.

Coaching record

Collegiate record

Professional record

References

1975 births
Filipino men's basketball players
Filipino men's basketball coaches
Rain or Shine Elasto Painters coaches
Living people
Benilde Blazers basketball players
Place of birth missing (living people)
Benilde Blazers basketball coaches
Letran Knights basketball coaches